Dubiaranea elegans is a species of spiders in the family Linyphiidae. It is known from South America.

References 

Linyphiidae
Spiders described in 1991
Spiders of South America